Purbeckopus is an ichnotaxon of pterosaur of the family Pteraichnidae. Considered as a nomen dubium, it lived in southern England during the Berriasian, in the Early Cretaceous. According to the fossil remains found, it is expected that it was a large pterosaur, with 6 m (19.7 ft) in wingspan.

See also
 Timeline of pterosaur research
 Ichnology
 List of pterosaur ichnogenera

References

Reptile trace fossils
Pterosaurs
Nomina dubia